Gold medals are the highest medal awarded for highest achievement in may fields.

Gold medal also may refer to:

 Gold medal awards, list of medals called "Gold Medal"
 Gold Medal (National Eisteddfod of Wales)
 The Gold Medal (film), 1969 Indian Bollywood spy film
 Gold Medal (album), a music album by American rock band The Donnas
 The Gold Medal Collection, 2-CD Harry Chapin music collection
 Gold Medal Studios, a revival of Biograph Studios
 Gold Medal Books, U.S. book publisher
 Gold Medal flour, a product of General Mills
 Gold Medal Park, park in Minneapolis, Minnesota, USA

Other
 Gold Medal in Metal (2008 CD/DVD) metal music by Dream Evil
 Medaglia d'Oro (racehorse), an American racehorse
 Triple Gold Club

See also
 Gold (disambiguation)
 Medal
 Silver Medal
 Bronze Medal
 Gold Medallion (disambiguation)
 Gold Star (disambiguation)
 Gold Award (disambiguation)